Shelley Looney (born January 21, 1972 in Brownstown, Michigan and raised in Trenton, Michigan) is an American ice hockey player and head coach. She scored the game-winning goal in the gold medal game for Team USA at the 1998 Winter Olympics, the team's first gold medal. She won a silver medal at the 2002 Winter Olympics. She played collegiate hockey at Northeastern University from 1991–94, winning multiple awards, including ECAC All-Star, 1993 ECAC Tournament MVP and ECAC Player of the Year (1993–94). She was inducted into Northeastern College's Hockey Hall of Fame in 1999 and the United States Olympic and Paralympic Hall of Fame in 2019.

Looney is currently the head coach of the Lindenwood University women's ice hockey team.

Playing career
In the gold medal game at the 1998 Winter Olympics, Looney scored the game-winning goal.  In the fall of 2002, she played with Team USA teammate Cammi Granato for the Vancouver Griffins of the National Women's Hockey League. She finished second on the team and fourth in the Western Conference with 35 points (10-25) in 24 regular-season games. She participated for Team British Columbia at the 2003 Esso Women's Nationals. She was named B.C. Player of the Game in the bronze medal game despite losing to Team Quebec.

While still playing for Team USA, Looney went into coaching, serving as an assistant with the Under-17 Boys' National Team Development Program in 2003, then joining the University of Vermont as assistant coach of the women's team in 2005-06. She left that position to train for the next Olympics.

In 2006, Looney was one of the final players cut from the Olympic team that would go on to win a bronze medal in Turin. She ended her USA Hockey career with 61 goals and 136 points in 151 games. 

Looney was the hockey director for the Buffalo Bison Hockey Association until 2019. 

Looney is head coach of the NCAA Division 1 Lindenwood University Lady Lions women's ice hockey team.

"Thank You Canada"
In 1980, the government of Canada helped six Americans escape from Iran when students stormed the US embassy, precipitating the Iran Hostage Crisis. Looney, then eight years old, wrote a letter of thanks to Canada. The letter was later transcribed and released as a single by Mercury Records in March 1980 under the title "(This Is My Country) Thank You, Canada". The brief (1:26) spoken-word record received some airplay and made Cashbox's Top 100 (two weeks at #99) and Billboard Magazine's "Bubbling Under The Hot 100" chart nationally, peaking at #109.

Awards and honors
1993 - ECAC Tournament Most Valuable Player 
2019 - Inducted into the U.S. Olympic and Paralympic Hall of Fame, along with other members of the 1998 U.S. Women's ice hockey team.

References

External links
bio

1972 births
American women's ice hockey forwards
Ice hockey coaches from Michigan
Ice hockey players at the 1998 Winter Olympics
Ice hockey players at the 2002 Winter Olympics
Living people
Medalists at the 1998 Winter Olympics
Medalists at the 2002 Winter Olympics
Northeastern Huskies women's ice hockey players
Olympic gold medalists for the United States in ice hockey
Olympic silver medalists for the United States in ice hockey
People from Wayne County, Michigan
Ice hockey players from Michigan